John Reber Alderton (September 5, 1931 – May 8, 2013) was a professional American football defensive lineman in the National Football League (NFL), a 1953 Draft pick for the Pittsburgh Steelers. He was born in Cumberland, Maryland. He captained for the Maryland Terrapins during their undefeated (10-0) season in 1951 (#34). He went on to play football while serving in the United States Air Force at Bolling Air Force Base in 1954 and 1955. In 1956, he played in three games for the Calgary Stampeders of the Canadian Football League.

References

External links
NFL.com profile

1931 births
2013 deaths
American football defensive ends
Pittsburgh Steelers players
Maryland Terrapins football players
Place of death missing
Calgary Stampeders players
United States Air Force airmen
Sportspeople from Cumberland, Maryland